The 2010–11 CCHL season was the 50th season of the Central Canada Hockey League (CCHL). The twelve teams of the CCHL played a 62-game schedule.

Come March, the top teams of the league played down for the Bogart Cup, the CHL championship.  The winner of the Bogart Cup competed in the Eastern Canadian Junior "A" championship, the Fred Page Cup.  Once successful against the winners of the Quebec Junior AAA Hockey League and Maritime Hockey League, the champion moved on to play in the Canadian Junior Hockey League championship, the 2011 Royal Bank Cup.

The Pembroke Lumber Kings won the league, the 2011 Fred Page Cup, and the 2011 Royal Bank Cup as National Junior A Champions.

Changes 
League changes name from Central Junior Hockey League to Central Hockey League.
League changes name again to Central Canada Hockey League (January 2011).

Current Standings 
Note: GP = Games played; W = Wins; L = Losses; OTL = Overtime losses; SL = Shootout losses; GF = Goals for; GA = Goals against; PTS = Points; x = clinched playoff berth; y = clinched division title; z = clinched conference title

Teams listed on the official league website.

Standings listed on official league website.

2010-11 Bogart Cup Playoffs

Playoff results are listed on the official league website.

Fred Page Cup Championship
Hosted by the Terrebonne Cobras in Terrebonne, Quebec.  The Pembroke Lumber Kings finished in first place.

Round Robin
Pembroke Lumber Kings 11 - Longueuil College Francais (QJAAAHL) 2
Pembroke Lumber Kings 9 - Summerside Western Capitals (MHL) 5
Terrebonne Cobras (QJAAAHL) 6 - Pembroke Lumber Kings 5

Final
Pembroke Lumber Kings 6 - Longueuil College Francais (QJAAAHL) 3

2011 Royal Bank Cup Championship
Hosted by the Camrose Kodiaks in Camrose, Alberta.  The Pembroke Lumber Kings finished in third place in the round robin and won the Semi-final and Final to win the National Championship.

Round Robin
Portage Terriers (MJHL) 5 - Pembroke Lumber Kings 2
Pembroke Lumber Kings 5 - Wellington Dukes (OJHL) 2
Camrose Kodiaks (AJHL) 2 - Pembroke Lumber Kings 1
Vernon Vipers (BCHL) 5 - Pembroke Lumber Kings 3

Semi-final
Pembroke Lumber Kings 4 - Camrose Kodiaks (AJHL) 2

Final
Pembroke Lumber Kings 2 - Vernon Vipers (BCHL) 0

Scoring leaders 
Note: GP = Games played; G = Goals; A = Assists; Pts = Points; PIM = Penalty minutes

Leading goaltenders 
Note: GP = Games played; Mins = Minutes played; W = Wins; L = Losses: OTL = Overtime losses; SL = Shootout losses; GA = Goals Allowed; SO = Shutouts; GAA = Goals against average

Awards
Most Outstandings Player - Jacob Laliberte (Cornwall Colts)
Scoring Champion - Jacob Laliberte (Cornwall Colts)
Rookie of the Year - Nathan Pancel (Gloucester Rangers)
Top Goaltender - Pete Karvouniaris (Cornwall Colts)
Top Team Goals Against - Cornwall Colts
Top Defenceman - Youseff Kabbaj (Cornwall Colts)
Top Prospects Award - Matthew Peca (Pembroke Lumber Kings)
Most Sportsmanlike Player - Michael Webley (Gloucester Rangers)
Most Improved Player - Ryan Van Stralen (Smiths Falls Bears)
Scholastic Player of the Year - Andrew Creppin (Gloucester Rangers)
Coach of the Year - Adam Dewan (Kanata Stallions)
Trainer of the Year - Dan McDowell (Nepean Raiders)
Pat Smith Award/Top Contributor to a Team - Krista Gill (Brockville Braves)
Manager of the Year - Sheldon Keefe (Pembroke Lumber Kings)

Players selected in 2011 NHL Entry Draft
Rd 7 #201   Matthew Peca -       Tampa Bay Lightning  (Pembroke Lumber Kings)

See also 
 2011 Royal Bank Cup
 Fred Page Cup
 Quebec Junior AAA Hockey League
 Maritime Hockey League
 2010 in ice hockey
 2011 in ice hockey

References

External links 
 Official website of the Central Hockey League
 Official website of the Canadian Junior Hockey League

CCHL
Central Canada Hockey League seasons